The Galveston Sand Crabs were a professional baseball team based in Texas. The team competed in the South Texas League and Texas League, and was an active baseball team from the 1903 season until the 1912 season and from 1922 to 1924. The team later merged to create the Galveston Buccaneers.

Galveston was home to the Galveston White Caps (1950–1955), Galveston Buccaneers (1931–1937), the earlier Galveston Sand Crabs (1889–1890, 1892, 1895–1899), Galveston Pirates (1912-1917, 1919–1920) and Galveston Giants (1888).

References

Baseball teams established in 1903
Defunct Texas League teams
History of Galveston, Texas
Sports in Galveston, Texas
Defunct baseball teams in Texas
Baseball teams disestablished in 1912
1903 establishments in Texas
1912 disestablishments in Texas
Texas-Southern League teams